Kenneth John Button (born 1948) is a British transport expert. He is a University Professor and Director of the Center for Transportation Policy, Operations and Logistics at George Mason University in Fairfax, Virginia.

Published works
He is an author of texts, journals, and conference papers in the transport policy and economics field, and he is particularly well known for his work on road user charging, aviation, and environmental analysis. He has published over 80 books and 400 academic papers.

References

External links
Kenneth Button's bio at the Mercatus Center

1948 births
Living people
George Mason University faculty